Embracer Group is a Swedish video game holding company controlled by Lars Wingefors. As of 2021 they own more than 76 internal studios in over 45 countries in Europe and the Americas. Its subsidiaries are organized under twelve groups: Amplifier Game Invest, Asmodee, CDE Entertainment, Coffee Stain Holding, Dark Horse Media, DECA Games, Easybrain, Embracer Freemode, Gearbox Entertainment, Plaion, Saber Interactive and THQ Nordic. Each group has its own operations, subsidiaries and development studios.

Acquisitions

References

External links 
 

 
Embracer Group